Ian Turnbull may refer to:

Ian Turnbull (politician) (born 1935), Canadian politician, teacher and international consultant
Ian Turnbull (ice hockey) (born 1953), Canadian former ice hockey player